Flatida is a genus of planthoppers in the family Flatidae and tribe Phromniini. Much of the literature on this genus refers to the name Phromnia, which has recently been recognized to be a junior synonym of Flatida. Species from the genus are found in tropical Africa and Asia.

Species

 Flatida aeruginosa (Schmidt, 1904)
 Flatida angolensis (Distant, 1910)
 Flatida bimaculata (Schmidt, 1912)
 Flatida bombycoides (Guérin-Méneville, 1844)
 Flatida cingulata Melichar, 1901
 Flatida coccinea (Auber, 1955)
 Flatida deltotensis (Kirby, 1891)
 Flatida flammicoma (Auber, 1954)
 Flatida floccosa (Guérin-Méneville, 1829)
 Flatida flosculina (Auber, 1955)
 Flatida hilaris (Gerstaecker, 1895)
 Flatida inornata (Walker, 1851)
 Flatida intacta (Walker, 1851)
 Flatida intermedia (Melichar, 1901)
 Flatida limbata (Fabricius, 1781)
 Flatida malgacha (Guérin-Méneville, 1844)
 Flatida marginata (Lallemand, 1942)
 Flatida marginella (Olivier, 1791)
 Flatida melichari (China, 1925)
 Flatida montivaga (Distant, 1892)
 Flatida neavei (Distant, 1910)
 Flatida ochreata (Melichar, 1901)
 Flatida pallida (Olivier, 1791)
 Flatida rosea (Melichar, 1901)
 Flatida rubescens (Stål, 1870)
 Flatida rubicunda (Distant, 1883)
 Flatida seriosa (Melichar, 1901)
 Flatida subguttata (Stål, 1870)
 Flatida superba (Melichar, 1901)
 Flatida tricolor (White, 1846)
 Flatida viridula (Atkinson, 1889)

References

External links
 
 

Flatidae
Auchenorrhyncha genera
Hemiptera of Africa
Hemiptera of Asia